Judge Owens (November 3, 1916 – November 22, 2001), nicknamed "Dusty", was an American Negro league infielder in the 1940s.

A native of Milner, Georgia, Owens played for the Atlanta Black Crackers in 1943, and also played for the Baltimore Elite Giants that season. In seven recorded games, he posted ten hits in 30 plate appearances. Owens died in Queens, New York in 2001 at age 85.

References

External links
 and Seamheads

1916 births
2001 deaths
Atlanta Black Crackers players
Baltimore Elite Giants players
Baseball infielders
Baseball players from Georgia (U.S. state)
People from Lamar County, Georgia
20th-century African-American sportspeople